"Purple Haze" is a 1967 song by The Jimi Hendrix Experience.

Purple Haze may also refer to:

Film and television 
 Purple Haze (film) a 1983 dramedy about a young man expelled from school and subsequently drafted to fight in Vietnam
 Purplehaze, one of 17 colors of the Sonochrome spectrum of pre-tinted film stocks introduced by Kodak
 "Purple Haze" (Eureka), an episode of Eureka TV series

Brands and drugs 
 Purple Haze (beer), an American beer
 Purple Haze (cannabis), a high-potency strain of Cannabis sativa

People
 Purple Haze, a ring name of American professional wrestler Mark Lewin
Alter ego and alias of Dutch DJ Sander van Doorn

Military
 Purple Haze, an expanded version of the Vietcong (video game)

 Operation Purple Haze, a 2007 military operation in the Iraq war

Music 
 Purple Haze (a cappella group), a choir at Northwestern University
 Purple Haze (album), a 2004 album by rapper Cam'ron
 "Purple Haze" (Groove Armada song), from the 2002 album LoveBox
 "Purple Haze", a song by DJ Kay Slay from the album The Streetsweeper, Vol. 1

Manga 
 Purple Haze, the Stand of Pannacotta Fugo from the fifth part of JoJo's Bizarre Adventure, Golden Wind

See also
Trapped in a Purple Haze, a TV movie
Haze (disambiguation)
Sander van Doorn - Also known as Purple Haze